Absolute Radio Extra was a part-time radio service similar to BBC Radio 5 Live Sports Extra. The station was launched to broadcast the live coverage of the Premier League Games under the Rock n Roll Football brand, also broadcast on the main Absolute station and Absolute Radio 90s. The station also used to broadcast live and pre-recorded uninterrupted sets from artists and bands under the Absolute Radio Live brand, In 2010 the station broadcast live sets from festivals such as V Festival. Also comedy sets are broadcast by Frank Skinner and Dave Gorman. When off air on DAB, 'Absolute R Extra' pointed listeners to Absolute Radio 90s.

Presenters 
 Russ Williams – Saturday 1.30pm – 3pm
 Jim Proudfoot Saturday 3pm – 5pm
 Ian Wright – Saturday 5pm – 6.30pm

Frequencies 
Absolute Radio Extra is available on Saturday afternoons on Absolute Radio's AM Frequencies between 1.30 and 6.30
In a number of areas, particularly in areas where the signal from the main 1215 transmitters overlap with each other, Absolute Radio Extra operates a number of filler transmitters on different frequencies :-
 1197 kHz – Brighton and Hove, Cambridge, South Devon, Dorset, South Essex, Gloucester, Oxford, Nottingham and Derby, Medway, Merseyside
 1233 kHz – Berkshire, North Essex, Northampton, Sheffield, Swindon, Gatwick
 1242 kHz – Teesside, Dundee, Peterborough and Lincoln and around the Wash (Boston transmitter), North Staffordshire and South Cheshire (Stoke)
 1260 kHz – Guildford, East Kent

Absolute Radio 90s
The sister station Absolute Radio 90s simulcasts on Absolute Radio Extra's frequencies, when the station is off air.

References

Absolute Radio
Radio stations established in 2010
2010 establishments in the United Kingdom
Bauer Radio